Liberties were an administrative unit of local government in England from the Middle Ages to the nineteenth century, co-existing with the then operative system of hundreds and boroughs but independent of both, generally for reasons of tenure. The following were the liberties in the county of Dorset and the areas they contained:

Alton Pancras
Bindon Liberty:
Chaldon Herring
Edmondsham (part)
Moreton (part)
Pulham (part)
West Lulworth
Wool

Broadwindsor
Corfe Castle (also described as a hundred)
Dewlish Liberty:
Dewlish
Milborne St Andrew (part)

Fordington Liberty:
Fordington
Hermitage
Minterne Magna (part)
Stockland (part) (ie, Dalwood, transferred to Devon 1844)

Frampton Liberty:
Bettiscombe
Bincombe
Burton Bradstock
Compton Valence
Frampton
Winterborne Came (part)

Gillingham Liberty:
Bourton (from 1866)
Gillingham
Motcombe

Halstock
Loders and Bothenhampton Liberty:
Bothenhampton
Loders

Owermoigne (formerly part of Winfrith Hundred)
Piddlehinton
Piddletrenthide Liberty:
Gorewood (from 1858)
Minterne Magna (part)
Piddletrenthide

Portland
Powerstock Liberty:
Powerstock (part)

Ryme Intrinseca
Stour Provost
Stoborough Liberty
Sutton Poyntz Liberty:
Chickerell (part)
Preston
Stockwood

Sydling St Nicholas
Waybayouse or Wabyhouse Liberty:
Upwey (part)

Wyke Regis and Elwell Liberty:
 Elwell, part of the parish of Upwey
Wyke Regis

Sources
Boswell, Edward, 1833: The Civil Division of the County of Dorset (published on CD by Archive CD Books Ltd, 1992)
Hutchins, John, History of Dorset, vols 1-4 (3rd ed 1861-70; reprinted by EP Publishing, Wakefield, 1973)
Mills, A D, 1977, 1980, 1989: Place Names of Dorset, parts 1-3. English Place Name Society: Survey of English Place Names vols LII, LIII and 59/60

 
History of Dorset
Liberties